Tvedt is a surname. Notable people with the surname include:

Birger Tvedt (1910–2002), Norwegian sports medical and physiotherapist
Chris Tvedt (born 1954), Norwegian lawyer and crime fiction writer
Jens Tvedt (1857–1935), Norwegian novelist and short story writer
Jon Tvedt (1966–2009), Norwegian orienteering competitor and athlete
Knut Tvedt (1906–1989), Norwegian director and jurist
Knut Are Tvedt (born 1952), Norwegian encyclopedist
Nils Tvedt (1883–1965), Norwegian diver
Terje Tvedt (born 1951), Norwegian academic, author and documentary film maker
Tom Tvedt (born 1968), Norwegian politician